The George McA. Miller House (also known as the Ruskin Women's Club) is a historic home in Ruskin, Florida. It is located at 508 Tamiami Trail. It was built in early 1900s as the residence of George McAnelly Miller, president of Ruskin College and his wife Addie Dickman Miller, the college's vice-president. It currently houses the Ruskin Woman's Club.

On July 23, 1974, it was added to the U.S. National Register of Historic Places.

References

External links
 Hillsborough County listings at National Register of Historic Places
 Florida's Office of Cultural and Historical Programs
 Hillsborough County listings
 Hillsborough County markers
 Ruskin Women's Club

Houses on the National Register of Historic Places in Hillsborough County, Florida